AAAN may refer to any of the following:

 Arab American Action Network, a Chicago community center
 AETN All Asia Networks Pte. Ltd., the joint venture of A+E Networks and Astro All Asia Networks
 Astro All Asia Networks, the company that operates the Astro satellite network